Vaast Barthélemy Henry, called Abbé Henry, (6 February 1797 – 21 February 1884) was a French Catholic priest, parish priest of Quarré-les-Tombes from 1823 to 1884. He is known as a regional historian.

Biography 
Henry was born in Seignelay. As a priest, he was appointed to his first post, vicar to Toucy, and in 1823, Archbishop of Sens (1817–1829), Monsignor Anne Louis Henri de La Fare (175–-1829) - appointed him dean of St. George parish in the area of Quarré-les-Tombes.

He wrote long pages about the patron saint of his parish and the pilgrimages formerly made in the church of Quarré in honor of this saint, as well as authentic relics brought back from Rome in 1859.

His relations with the local authorities were tense. He had the church enlarged in order to receive the faithful. In 1845 the north aisle and then in 1847 and 1849 the two lateral chapels, then in 1848 the first turret on the left, the second in 1850 which houses the baptismal fonts. To finish, in 1852? by the granite portal with its sculptures and the elevation of the bell tower.

In addition to the enlargement of the church, he had the reconstruction of the Chapelle Saint-Eptade carried out in 1860 at the Lavaults, along the road leading to Saint-Brisson, and the founding of two religious schools and various writings on the regional history of the canton and other stories of religious establishments and biographies of saints and other personalities.

Religious titles 
 Vicar of Toucy
 Curé-Doyen de Quarré-les-Tombes (1823–1884)
 Honorary Canon of Sens Metropole
 Member of several learned societies

Literary works 
 1833: Mémoires historiques sur la ville de Seignelay, 2.vol in-8., t.I 370.p. Carte, plan, lexique en patois, t.II. 403.p? Chez Comynet, Imprimeur Libraire à Avallon. Reprint 2004, Ed; Livre d'Histoire Lorisse t.I., t.II., 
 1839: 
 1853: Histoire de l'Abbaye de Saint-Germain d'Auxerre, Ch. Gallot in Auxerre, 590 pages.
 1863: Vies d', solitaire,  and Pierre, 43.p.
 1875: Mémoires historiques sur le , vol.I, Odobé, reissued by Ediplume, 2006, 716.p. .
 1876: Mémoires historiques sur le Canton de Quarré-les-Tombes, vol.II, Odobé, reissued by Ediplume, 2006, 716.p. ISB 2915301158.

Bibliography 
 Catherine Robbe, "Quel regard l'abbé Henry portait-il aux morvandiaux?", in Bulletin d'Information de Mémoires Vivantes du Canton de Quarré-les-Tombes, issue 42, summer 2012, pp. 5–8.
 "Henry (Vast-Barthélemy)", in Description des villes et campagnes du département de l'Yvonne, Ch. Gallot, 1870, volume 1, .
 Marc Pautet, Les Inconnus Célèbres de Quarré-les-Tombes et des environs, tome I & tome II. éd. Mémoires Vivantes du Canton de Quarré-les-Tombes.

External links 
 Mémoires historiques sur la ville de Seignelay, Département de l'Yonne, depuis sa fondation au VIIIe siècle jusqu'en 1853, précédés de recherches sur l'état du pays du temps des Gaulois et des Romains et suivis d'une notice historique sur les communes environnantes, avec les principales pièces justificatives
 Histoire de l'abbaye de Saint-Germain d'Auxerre on Gallica

People from Yonne
1797 births
1884 deaths
19th-century French historians
19th-century French Roman Catholic priests